The Hypostasis of the Archons, also called The Reality of the Rulers or The Nature of the Rulers, is a Gnostic writing. The only known surviving manuscript is in Coptic as the fourth tractate in Codex II of the Nag Hammadi library. It has some similarities with On the Origin of the World, which immediately follows it in the codex. The Coptic version is a translation of a Greek original, possibly written in Egypt in the third century AD. The text begins as an exegesis on Genesis 1–6 and concludes as a discourse explaining the nature of the world's evil authorities. It applies Christian Gnostic beliefs to the Jewish origin story, and translator Bentley Layton believes the intent is anti-Jewish.

Summary
The text proclaims to describe the reality of the authorities or the powers of darkness that are in conflict with the spirit of truth. The author directly quotes Ephesians 6:12: "our contest is not against flesh and blood; rather, the authorities of the universe and the spirits of wickedness." The chief of the authorities is Samael, who proclaims himself as God but is actually blind and mistaken. The authorities create a man out of soil from the earth, but they are powerless to give him life until the spirit comes forth from the Adamantine Land and breathes life into him. The man is named Adam and is put in the Garden to cultivate it, with a warning not to eat from the tree of recognizing good and evil.

The rulers cause Adam to fall into a deep sleep, then they open his side and create his female counterpart. When the spirit-endowed woman comes to him and speaks with him, the rulers become agitated and pursue her, but they defile only her shadowy reflection, because her incorruptible Spirit passes to the snake. The snake instructs the carnal woman to eat from the tree of recognizing good and evil, and she convinces Adam to do the same. Doing so causes their imperfection to become apparent, and they recognize their nakedness of the spiritual element.

The chief ruler comes to Adam and asks him where he is. Adam tells the ruler that he was afraid because he was naked and had hidden. The ruler accuses Adam of eating from the forbidden tree, and Adam blames the woman for giving him the fruit. The woman, in turn, blames the snake for leading her astray. The ruler curses the woman and the snake, with the snake's curse specified as being "until the all-powerful man was to come." Adam and Eve are expelled from the Garden. Eve gives birth to Cain as the result of her defilement by the rulers and then later gives birth to Abel from knowing Adam. Cain becomes jealous of his brother Abel and kills him, and God punishes Cain for his sin.

Eve then gives birth to Seth and Norea, who is said to be a virgin that the forces did not defile. The rulers plan to cause a flood to destroy all flesh, but the ruler of the forces warns Noah and instructs him to build an ark to save himself, his family, and the animals. Norea tries to board the ark but is initially denied, and when the rulers try to lead her astray, she resists and calls upon God for help. 

The great angel Eleleth appears to Norea, saves her from the lawless, and promises to teach her about her root. Eleleth claims to be one of the four light-givers and states that the rulers have no power over Norea and cannot prevail against the root of truth. Norea asks Eleleth about the origin of the authorities and their faculties. Eleleth explains that Sophia created a product like an aborted fetus that became an arrogant beast resembling a lion. The ruler created seven offspring and called himself god of the entirety. However, Zoe, the daughter of Sophia, cast the ruler, named Yaldabaoth, down into Tartaros. His offspring Sabaoth repented and was given charge of the seventh heaven.

Sabaoth creates a four-faced chariot of cherubim. Sophia places her daughter Zoe on his right and an angel of wrath on his left. The left side comes to represent unrighteousness while the right side represents life. Yaldabaoth becomes envious and produces an androgynous offspring, envy, that engenders death. Eleleth says that Norea is from the primeval father, out of the imperishable light. The text ends with Eleleth's prediction of the true man revealing the spirit of truth and the children of the light being truly acquainted with the truth, the father of the entirety, and the holy spirit.

References

Biblical exegesis
Gnosticism
Early Christianity and Gnosticism
3rd-century Christian texts
Texts in Coptic
Nag Hammadi library
Sethian texts